The Chouteau Limestone is a geologic formation in Illinois, Iowa, Kansas, and Missouri. It preserves fossils dating back to the Carboniferous period.

See also

 List of fossiliferous stratigraphic units in Illinois

References

Carboniferous Illinois
Carboniferous Kansas
Carboniferous Missouri
Carboniferous Iowa
Carboniferous southern paleotemperate deposits